The 1933 Pacific hurricane season ran through the summer and fall of 1933. Before the satellite age started in the 1960s, data on east Pacific hurricanes was extremely unreliable. Most east Pacific storms were of no threat to land.

Systems

Tropical Cyclone One
On May 30, a tropical cyclone existed in the Gulf of Tehuantepec. Shortly after its discovery, it dissipated off the coast of Guatemala.

Possible Tropical Cyclone Two
Sometime in June, a possible tropical cyclone existed south of the Mexican coast.

Possible Tropical Cyclone Three
A possible tropical cyclone was reported between Salina Cruz and Acapulco July 7. It had moved closer to Acapulco by July 8. This system might have been associated with the remnants of the Atlantic's second tropical cyclone.

Possible Tropical Cyclone Four
Another possible tropical cyclone existed in the same area on July 29.

Tropical Storm Five
A tropical cyclone formed in the Gulf of Tehuantepec on August. It moved along the coast, becoming at least a tropical storm, and dissipated in the Gulf of California on August 19 or 20.

Possible Tropical Cyclone Six
A possible tropical cyclone existed on September 13. It was located well west of Manzanillo.

Hurricane Seven
A "tropical hurricane" was tracked well northeast of Hawaii between October 7 and 9.

See also

1933 Atlantic hurricane season
1933 Pacific typhoon season
1930s North Indian Ocean cyclone seasons
 1900–1940 South Pacific cyclone seasons
 1900–1950 South-West Indian Ocean cyclone seasons
 1930s Australian region cyclone seasons

References

1933 in Mexico
Pacific hurricane seasons
1933 in Hawaii
1930s Pacific hurricane seasons